Qiu Leng (born 29 September 1997) is a Chinese snowboarder, specializing in half pipe. She competed in the 2018 Winter Olympics, placing 16th.

References

1997 births
Living people
People from Qinhuangdao
Sportspeople from Hebei
Snowboarders at the 2018 Winter Olympics
Snowboarders at the 2022 Winter Olympics
Chinese female snowboarders
Olympic snowboarders of China
Snowboarders at the 2017 Asian Winter Games
Universiade silver medalists for China
Universiade medalists in snowboarding
Competitors at the 2019 Winter Universiade
21st-century Chinese women